The Gervaize Rocks are a group of rocks about  north-northeast of Cape Ducorps, Trinity Peninsula, Antarctica. They were mapped from surveys by the Falkland Islands Dependencies Survey (1960–61), and were named by the UK Antarctic Place-Names Committee for Charles Gervaize, a French naval officer on the Astrolabe during her Antarctic voyage (1837–40).

References

Rock formations of the Trinity Peninsula